Michael Mulheren is an American actor from Middletown, New Jersey. Best known for Law & Order, Rescue Me, and Royal Pains.

Career

Theatre 
Mulheren's Broadway debut was in 1995 in On the Waterfront, after previously appearing in the off-Broadway run of The Fantasticks in the 1980s. He also appeared in the 1997 production of Broadway's The Titanic. Other Broadway credits include  The Boy from Oz and La Cage aux Folles; his performance in Kiss Me, Kate earned him Drama Desk and Tony Award nominations. Mulheren also appeared on Broadway in Deuce, which starred Angela Lansbury and Marian Seldes.

Mulheren appeared in the Broadway run of Aaron Sorkin's The Farnsworth Invention, as well as in Matthew Lombardo's Looped. He also appeared in the rock musical Spider-Man: Turn Off the Dark as J. Jonah Jameson. The production was directed by Julie Taymor and featured music by U2's Bono and The Edge. The show premiered in November 2010 and closed in January 2014.

Mulheren has performed in several Encores! concerts, including Li'l Abner (1998), Do Re Mi  (1999), and Of Thee I Sing (2006). His most recent Encores! concert performance was in Damn Yankees in 2008 at the New York City Center. He co-starred along with Veanne Cox and Randy Graff.

Mulheren's most recent Broadway role has been in 2016 as Mayor Dobbs in Steve Martin and Edie Brickell's Bright Star.

Television and film 
Mulheren has guest-starred on several TV shows including Royal Pains, White Collar, Rescue Me (playing Chief Perolli), Law & Order, 30 Rock, The West Wing, and Lipstick Jungle. He has also appeared in the films Fool’s Gold, Invincible, Bringing Out the Dead, and The Curse of the Jade Scorpion, among others.

, he portrays George Sibley in a recurring role on Salem.

In 2018, he had a recurring role in Daredevil as Edward Nelson, father of  Foggy Nelson.

Filmography

Film

Television

Stage

Video games

References

External links 

Michael Mulheren at the Lortel Archives
 

Male actors from New Jersey
American male film actors
American male musical theatre actors
Living people
Year of birth missing (living people)
People from Middletown Township, New Jersey